Darabad (also romanized as Darābād) is a village in the Sabalan District of Sareyn County, Ardabil Province, Iran. During the 2006 census, its population was 430 with approximately 103 families.

References 

Towns and villages in Sareyn County